The Manuela Beltrán University, also called UMB, is a private, coeducational university based in the city of Bogotá, Colombia.

See also

 List of universities in Colombia

References

External links
 Manuela Beltrán University official site 

Universities and colleges in Colombia